Kavijan (also Romanized as Kavījān and Kevījān; also known as Kabīgūn) is a village in Banestan Rural District, in the Central District of Behabad County, Yazd Province, Iran. At the 2006 census, its population was 210, in 65 families.

References 

Populated places in Behabad County